Harry Grundy (1881 – after 1926) was an English footballer who made eight appearances in the Football League playing for Everton and Lincoln City. He played as an outside left. He also played in the Midland League for Lincoln City, and in the Southern and Western Leagues for Reading.

Life and career
Grundy was born in Oswestry, Shropshire. He played football for nearby Chirk, Wrexham and Neston before joining First Division club Everton in November 1905 at a wage of £2 a week and a signing-on bonus of £5. He made his debut on 20 December, in a goalless draw away to Middlesbrough, and played his second and what turned out to be final first-team game for the club a few weeks later, in a 4–2 defeat at Newcastle United. After some consideration, Everton chose not to re-engage Grundy for the coming season, and placed him on the transfer list at a fee of £25.

As there were no takers from the Football League, Grundy was allowed to join non-league club Reading. The Daily Express wrote that much was expected of the player, who had "shown himself to be very speedy; he accurately centres when going at top speed, and his foot-work generally is admirable". Grundy played for Reading in both Southern and Western Leagues. Everton retained Grundy's Football League registration until April 1908, when he was allowed to leave on a free transfer.

He signed for Lincoln City, then bottom of the Second Division, in time to play in the last three games of the season, but Lincoln were unable to improve their position. They failed to be re-elected to the Football League, and were accepted into the Midland League for 1908–09. Grundy missed just two games in league and FA Cup as Lincoln won the Midland League title, but played only three more first-team matches after their election back to the Football League.

Notes

References

1881 births
Year of death missing
Sportspeople from Oswestry
English footballers
Association football wingers
Chirk AAA F.C. players
Wrexham A.F.C. players
Everton F.C. players
Reading F.C. players
Lincoln City F.C. players
English Football League players
Southern Football League players
Western Football League players
Midland Football League players
Place of death missing